Thiago Martinelli da Silva (born January 14, 1980 in Jundiaí), is a Brazilian central defender. He last played for Audax-SP.

Honours
Brazilian League (3rd division): 2001
São Paulo State League: 2004

Contract
16 July 2007 to 15 July 2010 (Cruzeiro) (Terminated contract)

External links

 CBF
 sambafoot
 Guardian Stats Centre
 zerozero.pt
 soccerterminal
 centralbrasileirao
 Thiago é o novo reforço do Cruzeiro

1980 births
Living people
Brazilian footballers
Brazilian expatriate footballers
Paulista Futebol Clube players
Associação Desportiva São Caetano players
Cruzeiro Esporte Clube players
Grêmio Osasco Audax Esporte Clube players
Cerezo Osaka players
J2 League players
Expatriate footballers in Japan
Brazilian people of Italian descent
Association football defenders
People from Jundiaí
Footballers from São Paulo (state)